Hellpoint is an 2020 action role-playing game developed by Cradle Games and published by tinyBuild. It released for Windows, Linux, MacOS, PlayStation 4, and Xbox One on July 30. The player takes on the role of a nameless humanoid stranded on derelict space station Irid Novo, and must battle vicious creatures in order to solve the mystery behind the events that happened there. Irid Novo orbits a massive black hole; the station's position in relation to the black hole affects the strength of enemies. Versions for Stadia and Nintendo Switch were released in February 2021, with PlayStation 5 and Xbox Series X/S versions released in July 2022.

Gameplay 
In Hellpoint, the gameplay revolves mainly around combat. The player has both light and strong attacks in their arsenal, as well as an evade mechanic. The game progress can be saved at breaches which do not resurrect foes as they respawn after a certain amount of time. Up to two healing injections can be stored. The healing gauge is refilled by dealing damage to monsters. The game relies heavily on exploration, offering a number of secrets to discover. They may be hidden behind secret doors or in seemingly inaccessible places that can be reached by utilizing the jump mechanic.

Hellpoint has been dubbed a "Soulslike" game, due to similarities in gameplay mechanics with the Dark Souls series.

Development

In 2017, Cradle Games initiated a Kickstarter campaign to fund the development of their project. With the initial goal of CA$50,000, they managed to gather CA$64,500 over a span of two years. In 2019, the project was declared funded.

Response 

Hellpoint received "mixed or average reviews" from critics, according to review aggregator Metacritic.

Playable sequel chapter 
A playable sequel chapter, Hellpoint: The Thespian Feast, was released on February 20, 2020. The events of this chapter take place half a century after the events of the main game.

References 

2020 video games
Action role-playing video games
Dark fantasy video games
Windows games
Linux games
Classic Mac OS games
PlayStation 4 games
PlayStation 5 games
Nintendo Switch games
Xbox One games
Xbox Series X and Series S games
Multiplayer and single-player video games
Kickstarter-funded video games
Video games set in outer space
Video games developed in Canada
Science fiction video games
Soulslike video games
Stadia games
tinyBuild games